Kinston Baptist-White Rock Presbyterian Church is a historic Presbyterian and Baptist church building located at 516 Thompson Street in Kinston, Lenoir County, North Carolina. It was built in 1857–1858, and is a rectangular, temple-form Greek Revival style frame building with a pedimented front gable roof. It features a bold distyle in antis portico with enclosed end bays.  The church was built for the Kinston Baptist Church and moved to its present (third) location in 1901 after its purchase by an African-American Presbyterian congregation (White Rock Church) which it has served since that time.

It was listed on the National Register of Historic Places in 1989.

References

19th-century Presbyterian church buildings in the United States
Baptist churches in North Carolina
Churches in Lenoir County, North Carolina
National Register of Historic Places in Lenoir County, North Carolina
Presbyterian churches in North Carolina
Churches on the National Register of Historic Places in North Carolina
Churches completed in 1858